Boromo Airport  was a public use airport located in Boromo, Balé Province, Burkina Faso.

Sometime after 2002, the  dirt runway began to be overbuilt with structures, and is now unusable.

See also
List of airports in Burkina Faso

References

External links 
 Airport record for Boromo Airport at Landings.com

Defunct airports
Airports in Burkina Faso
Balé Province